Shibaji Banerjee (died 19 February 2017) was an Indian footballer who played as a goalkeeper for Mohun Bagan and the India national team.

Playing career
He was mainly known as the goalkeeper for Mohun Bagan when the club took on the New York Cosmos in a friendly match in 1977. The Cosmos at the time had former Brazilian international Pelé on their side. Banerjee managed to stop a free-kick from the Brazilian during the match as it ended 2–2.

After retiring from playing, Banerjee remained on the technical committee for Mohun Bagan. On 18 February 2017, the day before his death, Banerjee was in attendance as Mohun Bagan defeated DSK Shivajians in an I-League match 3–1. The next day, Banerjee died of a heart attack.

Honours
Mohun Bagan
Federation Cup: 1978–79

Individual
Mohun Bagan Ratna: 2021

References

Further reading 
 
 
 
 
 
 

1950s births
2017 deaths
Indian footballers
Mohun Bagan AC players
Association football goalkeepers
Footballers from Kolkata
India international footballers